Tsidem Asafoglou ( Tsigdém Asáfoglou) is a Greek politician, currently president of the Party of Friendship, Equality and Peace, representing part of the  Muslim Minority of Western Thrace.

Asafoglou was born on 17 November 1987 in Xanthi, Greece. She studied at Limachers Primary School and 1st State High School in Xanthi. She completed her university education at the Department of Philosophy and Pedagogy of the Aristotle University of Thessaloniki. After working actively for 3 years as a member of the FEP Party she was elected as the chairman in the party congress on 5 January 2019. She is married and the mother of one child.

References 

21st-century Greek politicians
1987 births
Greek people of Turkish descent
People from Xanthi
Aristotle University of Thessaloniki alumni
21st-century Greek women politicians
Living people